In geometry, the tridyakis icosahedron is the dual polyhedron of the nonconvex uniform polyhedron, icositruncated dodecadodecahedron. It has 44 vertices, 180 edges, and 120 scalene triangular faces.

Proportions 
The dihedral angle equals . Part of each triangle lies within the solid, hence is invisible in solid models.

See also
 Catalan solid Duals to convex uniform polyhedra
 Uniform polyhedra
 List of uniform polyhedra

References
 Photo on page 96, Dorman Luke construction and stellation pattern on page 97.
 

Dual uniform polyhedra